Alois Bohdan Brixius (30 September 1903 - 19 February 1959) was a Czech traveller, orientalist, journalist and travel writer.

In the 1920s and 1930s he made several trips to the Middle East. After conversion to Islam he published under the name Mohamed Abdallah-hadži Brikcius. An active member of Vlajka since 1936.

1903 births
1959 deaths
People from the Municipality of Bohinj
20th-century Czech people
20th-century explorers
Czech explorers
Czechoslovak explorers
Explorers of Asia
Czech orientalists
Czech journalists
Czech male writers
Czech Muslims
Converts to Islam
Czechoslovak fascists
Czech expatriates in Slovenia
20th-century journalists